Jeanne Tsai is an Associate Professor of Psychology at Stanford University and director of the Culture and Emotion Lab. Her research focuses on cultural influences on basic psychological and social processes related to emotion. She was born to Taiwanese immigrants.

Education 
She earned a Bachelor's degree in Psychology from Stanford University in 1991 and a Ph.D. in Clinical Psychology from the University of California, Berkeley in 1996.

External links 
Culture and Emotion Lab
Stanford Magazine article

Living people
American people of Taiwanese descent
Stanford University alumni
Stanford University Department of Psychology faculty
UC Berkeley College of Letters and Science alumni
Year of birth missing (living people)